The Oklahoma District is one of the 35 districts of the Lutheran Church–Missouri Synod (LCMS), and comprises the state of Oklahoma. It includes approximately 80 congregations and missions, subdivided into 9 circuits, as well as 15 preschools and 10 elementary schools. Baptized membership in district congregations is approximately 21,890.

The Oklahoma District was formed in 1924 out of the Kansas District.  District offices are located in Norman, Oklahoma. Delegates from each congregation meet in convention every three years to elect the district president, vice presidents, circuit counselors, a board of directors, and other officers. Rev. David Nehrenz was elected in 2022.

Presidents
Rev. Henry Mueller, 1924–39
Rev. Carl R. Matthies, 1939–40
Rev. Edward C. Hauer, 1940–42
Rev. Paul J. Hartenberger, 1942–43
Rev. Otto Henry Hoyer, 1943–54
Rev. Alfred E. Behrend, 1954–70
Rev. Harold E. Brockhoff, 1970–78
Rev. Gerhard F. Bode, 1978–88
Rev. Robert L. Jackson, 1988–91
Rev. William R. Diekelman, 1991-2004
Rev. Paul A. Hartman, 2004-2009
Rev. Barrie E. Henke, 2009–2022
Rev. David Nehrenz, 2022 to present

References

External links
Oklahoma District web site
LCMS: Oklahoma District
LCMS Congregation Directory

Lutheran Church–Missouri Synod districts
Lutheranism in Oklahoma
Christian organizations established in 1924